Lynden is part of Flamborough, which is itself part of the city of Hamilton, Ontario, Canada.  Lynden now has fewer than 500 residents.  There used to be a train station in Lynden that went to Hamilton and Lynden provided goods to that city.  Currently Lynden has many farmers, small business entrepreneurs and commuters to Hamilton, Cambridge, Dundas, Brantford and Toronto.

Phone numbers in Lynden begin with 519-647.

History
In the 1840s, the village was originally called VanSickle after local miller Benony VanSickle. In 1853, Jeremiah Bishop renamed the community after Lyndon, Vermont.

Notable people
 Birthplace of NHL Hall of Famer, Red Horner.
 David Forsyth, considered to be the Father of Canadian Soccer was brought to Lynden from Scotland at the age of one in 1853.  He attended school in Lynden, then in the Spring of 1865 he entered Dundas High School.  Later he went on to attend Galt Collegiate Institute and the University of Toronto. He formed the Western Football (Soccer) Association in Berlin, Ontario in 1880, one of the oldest soccer associations in the world.
 Steve Ihnat, actor and movie director, although born in Czechoslovakia, attended Lynden Public School from the age of 5.

Local Schools
Lynden School (originally Lynden Public and Continuation School, 1924)

References

External links
Google Maps: Lynden, Ontario (Hybrid)

Neighbourhoods in Hamilton, Ontario